was a Japanese samurai of the late Azuchi–Momoyama period, who lived into the early Edo period. He was also the daimyō of the Takamatsu Domain.

Masatoshi fought at the Siege of Osaka in 1614, commanding a detached force on the side of the Tokugawa.

After his death, he was succeeded as family head by his son, Takatoshi.

References
http://www.asahi-net.or.jp/~me4k-skri/han/shikoku/marugame.html

Daimyo
Samurai
1586 births
1621 deaths